is a Japanese voice actress from Nagoya, Aichi Prefecture, Japan. She is known for her roles as Yuzu in Konohana Kitan and Aya Asagiri in Magical Girl Site.

Biography
Ono attended Kogakuin University. After moving to Tokyo in 2013, she entered the drama department of Nihon Kogakuin College, and in 2015 became a training student for the Mausu Promotion's Affiliate Training School.

In April 2017, she became a member of Mausu Promotion.

On November 7, 2018, the company announced a temporary closure to concentrate on treatment for health reasons through Mausu Promotion. On January 7, 2019, Ono announced that she would return to work while monitoring the progress of the treatment.

Filmography

Anime
2017
Angel's 3Piece! - Jun Gotō
Konohana Kitan - Yuzu

2018
Magical Girl Site - Aya Asagiri
Ongaku Shōjo - Hiyo Yukino
Ulysses: Jeanne d'Arc and the Alchemist Knight - Jeanne d'Arc

2019
Tenka Hyakken ~Meiji-kan e Yōkoso!~ - Jōizumi Masamune

2020
Infinite Dendrogram - Nemesis
Tsugu Tsugumomo - Azami
Lapis Re:Lights - Kaede
The Misfit of Demon King Academy - Maia Zemut

2021
Yuki Yuna is a Hero - Aya Kokudo
Lupin III Part 6 - Emi

2023
The Misfit of Demon King Academy II - Maia Zemut
Apparently, Disillusioned Adventurers Will Save the World - Lynn

Films
2016
Planetarian: The Reverie of a Little Planet - Boy

Video games
WHITEDAY - Hina Kisaragi
Tenka Hyakken - Jouizumi Masamune
Tower of Princess
Alternative Girls - Belulu
Samurai Shodown - Rimururu
Fire Emblem: Three Houses - Flayn
Yuki Yuna is a Hero: Hanayui no Kirameki - Aya Kokudo
Azur Lane - Oyashio, Kuroshio
The King of Fighters All Star - Rimururu
Girls' Frontline - Tabuk
Blue Reflection: Second Light - Kirara Kuno
Atelier Sophie 2: The Alchemist of the Mysterious Dream - Dumortier

References

External links
 

Living people
Japanese video game actresses
Japanese voice actresses
Mausu Promotion voice actors
Voice actresses from Nagoya
1993 births
21st-century Japanese actresses